Khadro railway station (Sindhi: کڏڙو ريلوي اسٽيشن) is located in Khadro, District Sanghar, Pakistan.

See also
 List of railway stations in Pakistan
 Pakistan Railways

References

External links

Railway stations in Sanghar District
Railway stations on Mirpur Khas–Nawabshah Branch Line